(Stochastic) variance reduction is an algorithmic approach to minimizing functions that can be decomposed into finite sums. By exploiting the finite sum structure, variance reduction techniques are able to achieve convergence rates that are impossible to achieve with methods that treat the objective as an infinite sum, as in the classical Stochastic approximation setting.

Variance reduction approaches are widely used for training machine learning models such as logistic regression and support vector machines as these problems have finite-sum structure and uniform conditioning that make them ideal candidates for variance reduction.

Finite sum objectives
A function  is considered to have finite sum structure if it can be decomposed into a summation or average:

where the function value and derivative of each  can be queried independently. Although variance reduction methods can be applied for any positive  and any  structure, their favorable theoretical and practical properties arise when  is large compared to the condition number of each , and when the  have similar (but not necessarily identical) Lipschitz smoothness and strong convexity constants.

The finite sum structure should be contrasted with the stochastic approximation setting which deals with functions of the form 
which is the expected value of a function depending on a random variable . Any finite sum problem can be optimized using a stochastic approximation algorithm by using .

Rapid Convergence
Stochastic variance reduced methods without acceleration are able to find a minima of  within accuracy , i.e.  in a number of steps of the order:

The number of steps depends only logarithmically on the level of accuracy required, in contrast to the stochastic approximation framework, where the number of steps  required grows proportionally to the accuracy required.
Stochastic variance reduction methods converge almost as fast as the gradient descent method's  rate, despite using only a stochastic gradient, at a  lower cost than gradient descent.

Accelerated methods in the stochastic variance reduction framework achieve even faster convergence rates, requiring only

steps to reach  accuracy, potentially  faster than non-accelerated methods. Lower complexity bounds. for the finite sum class establish that this rate is the fastest possible for smooth strongly convex problems.

Approaches
Variance reduction approaches fall within 3 main categories: table averaging methods, full-gradient snapshot methods and dual methods. Each category contains methods designed for dealing with convex, non-smooth, and non-convex problems, each differing in hyper-parameter settings and other algorithmic details.

SAGA
In the SAGA method, the prototypical table averaging approach, a table of size  is maintained that contains the last gradient witnessed for each  term, which we denote . At each step, an index  is sampled, and a new gradient  is computed. The iterate  is updated with:
 

SAGA is among the most popular of the variance reduction methods due to its simplicity, easily adaptable theory, and excellent performance. It is the successor of the SAG method, improving on its flexibility and performance.

SVRG
The stochastic variance reduced gradient method (SVRG), the prototypical snapshot method, uses a similar update except instead of using the average of a table it instead uses a full-gradient that is reevaluated at a snapshot point  at regular intervals of  iterations. The update becomes:
 
This approach requires two stochastic gradient evaluations per step, one to compute  and one to compute  where-as table averaging approaches need only one. 

Despite the high computational cost, SVRG is popular as its simple convergence theory is highly adaptable to new optimization settings. It also has lower storage requirements than tabular averaging approaches, which make it applicable in many settings where tabular methods can not be used.

SDCA
Exploiting the dual representation of the objective leads to another variance reduction approach that is particularly suited to finite-sums where each term has a structure that makes computing the convex conjugate  or its proximal operator tractable. The standard SDCA method considers finite sums that have additional structure compared to generic finite sum setting:

SDCA solves the dual problem:

by a stochastic coordinate ascent procedure, where at each step the objective is optimized with respect to a randomly chosen coordinate , leaving all other coordinates the same. An approximate primal solution  can be recovered from the  values:
.
This method obtains similar theoretical rates of convergence to other stochastic variance reduced methods, while avoiding the need to specify a step-size parameter. It is fast in practice when  is large, but significantly slower than the other approaches when  is small.

Accelerated approaches

Accelerated variance reduction methods are built upon the standard methods above. The earliest approaches make use of proximal operators to accelerate convergence, either approximately or exactly. Direct acceleration approaches have also been developed

Catalyst acceleration
The catalyst framework uses any of the standard methods above as an inner optimizer to approximately solve a proximal operator:

after which it uses an extrapolation step to determine the next :

The catalyst method's flexibility and simplicity make it a popular baseline approach. It doesn't achieve the optimal rate of convergence among accelerated methods, it is potentially slower by up to a log factor in the hyper-parameters.

Point-SAGA
Proximal operations may also be applied directly to the  terms to yield an accelerated method. The Point-SAGA method replaces the gradient operations in SAGA with proximal operator evaluations, result in a simple, direct acceleration method:

with the table update  performed after each step. Here  is defined as the proximal operator for the th term:

Unlike other known accelerated methods, Point-SAGA requires only a single iterate sequence  to be maintained between steps, and it has the advantage of only having a single tunable parameter . It obtains the optimal accelerated rate of convergence for strongly convex finite-sum minimization without additional log factors.

See also
 Stochastic gradient descent
 Coordinate descent
 Online machine learning
 Proximal operator
 Stochastic optimization
 Stochastic approximation

References

Stochastic optimization
Gradient methods
Machine learning algorithms
Convex optimization